The Tellier T.2  was a French two-seat patrol biplane flying-boat built by Société Alphonse Tellier et Cie à Neuilly (hull) and Voisin (wings). The wooden-hull flying boat used a  Hispano-Suiza 8Ba engine and was first flown in June 1916.

Test flights were successful, which led to orders for an improved variant, the Tellier T.3, the T.2 was destroyed in 1916, after an engine failed in flight, due to carburetor failure.

Specifications

References

1910s French military reconnaissance aircraft
Tellier aircraft
Flying boats
Biplanes
Aircraft first flown in 1916